Bloom is a studio mini-album by Swedish cinematic post-rock band Lights & Motion. It was released worldwide on February 2, 2018, through the American independent record label Deep Elm Records. The album was produced and mixed by Christoffer Franzén and recorded in Gothenburg between 2016 and 2018. It was mastered by Dave Cooley (M83, Paramore) at Elysian Masters, Los Angeles.

Track listing

Personnel 
 Christoffer Franzén – vocals, electric guitar, acoustic guitar, bass guitar, drums, percussion, keyboards, programming, piano, synthesizer, glockenspiel, orchestration, sound design, string arrangements
 Shane Labelle – artwork

References 

2018 albums
Lights & Motion albums
Deep Elm Records albums